George Lambert Kramer (June 2, 1894 – September 22, 1974) was an American football player.  A native of Joliet, Illinois, he played professional football in the National Football League (NFL) as a guard and tackle for the Minneapolis Marines. He appeared in 19 NFL games, 10 as a starter, from 1921 to 1924.

References

1894 births
1974 deaths
People from Joliet, Illinois
Players of American football from Illinois
Minneapolis Marines players